In politics, a revolving door is a situation in which personnel move between roles as legislators and regulators, on one hand, and members of the industries affected by the legislation and regulation, on the other, analogous to the movement of people in a physical revolving door.

In some cases, the roles are performed in sequence, but in certain circumstances they may be performed at the same time. Political analysts claim that an unhealthy relationship can develop between the private sector and government, based on the granting of reciprocated privileges to the detriment of the nation, and can lead to regulatory capture.

The term has also been used in a different context, to refer to the constant switching and ousting of political leaders from offices such as in Australia (which changed Prime Ministers 6 times from 2007-2018) and Japan.

Overview

Previous work 
The revolving door phenomenon has become a public interest in the 2010s, with the writings of Andrew Baker, Simon Johnson and James Kwak. In the literature, it has been described as a means to influence the financial industry. This theory gained a new level of importance in the United States, following the 2008 crisis, when prominent government figures insinuated that previous and future hirings in the financial sphere manipulates the decision-making of eminent government members when it comes to financial matters.

Governments hire industry professionals for their private sector experience, their influence within corporations that the government is attempting to regulate or do business with, and in order to gain political support (donations and endorsements) from private firms.

Industry, in turn, hires people out of government positions to gain personal access to government officials, seek favorable legislation/regulation and government contracts in exchange for high-paying employment offers, and get inside information on what is going on in government.

In fact, the regulator while in office takes actions and makes decisions enabling him to cash in later when joining a firm he has regulated. These actions are termed as  bureaucratic capital. It is essentially inside knowledge of the system, including any loopholes that might exist. ‘Bureaucratic capital’ consists also of good relationship with the lower-level bureaucracy.  ‘Bureaucratic capital’ therefore enables the bureaucrat to cash in later thereon, after exiting the public sector and joining a firm in the sector he previously regulated. Thus, the bureaucrat can abuse the previous position to increase income in a legal way.

The lobbying industry is especially affected by the revolving door concept, as the main asset for a lobbyist is contacts with and influence on government officials. This industrial climate is attractive for ex-government officials. It can also mean substantial monetary rewards for the lobbying firms and government projects and contracts in the hundreds of millions for those they represent.

Consequences 
Scientific papers have demonstrated the consequences of the revolving doors practice and the side effects of those movements are numerous. These can be beneficial either for the companies or for the regulatory bodies.

Authors, such as David Miller and William Dinan, have claimed that there are risks when going in and out of revolving doors. The consequences of this movement can be conflict of interest or the loss of confidence in the regulating institutions. Another possible side effect of the revolving door practice is that regulators could give away confidential information held by the financial institutions, which would give companies the possibility to get access to information and people involved in the decision-making process of regulating authorities. Revolving doors can also lead to unfair competition advantage as well as an unfair distribution of influencing power. Economic distortion can be explained through the fact that so-called too-big-to-fail firms generate their power in the market through the mechanism of the revolving door and not through salient choices. This is due to the fact that big companies have more money than smaller ones and can thus allow themselves to hire more revolvers.

Another aspect of the revolving door practice is that regulators might be incentive to push for softer regulation in order to gain access later on in the private sector. Vice versa, regulators can also be influenced to demand for stronger stances in policy fields that will benefit the regulator if he aims at a future career in the private sector.

Furthermore, revolving doors make it easier for regulatory agencies to find adequate and qualified workers.

In practice, banks can gain unlawful advantages by legally and illegally manipulating the different stages of policy-making. They can have an impact on the formulation, adoption and implementation of laws, public policies or regulations in different ways:

 Firstly, if (former) Members of Parliament have links to private companies, they can have an influence on the adoption of laws and regulations in their favour. Moreover, they may be reluctant to vote on proposals that would harm corporate interests.
 Secondly, if companies have connections to (former) ministers and their advisors, they may affect the formulation and implementation of policies and regulations in advance or take advantage of non-public information about the regulated industry. This means that the companies can get in advance notice of incoming regulations and that they can be warned of further consequences, negative as well as positive. In most European countries, but also in the US, the use of insider information is punishable by law. In practice, insider trading is most often observed on the stock exchange and also plays a role in revolving doors.

Jurisdictions
Regulation relating to this phenomenon and the related issues of lobbying and the funding of political parties varies considerably around the world. Here are details for a few sample jurisdictions:-

Australia
In Australia, this is of significant public debate as many state leaders have become private consultants for corporations. There is no legislation against doing so.

In 2015, Port Darwin in Australia's Northern Territory was leased for 99 years to Shandong Landbridge, a Chinese company closely aligned with the Chinese Government's trade policy. The deal was approved by Minister for Trade and Investment Andrew Robb, a member of the governing Liberal Party. In 2016, Robb left politics and accepted a "consultant" position at Shandong Landbridge, with an $880,000 per year salary. In 2019, Robb left the position, shortly before a new "foreign interference" law took effect in Australia.

European Union
There are different rules applied regarding the institution/agency/body involved.

Applying rules 
The general principle is the following: the Staff Regulation and Article 339 of the Treaty on the Functioning of the European Union apply to all EU officials. However, each institution/body/agency has to adopt its own internal rules and to annually report on this implementation of art. 16 Staff Regulation addressing the revolving doors problem.

This Staff Regulation addresses the rights and obligations of officials such as their duty of impartiality and loyalty (art. 11). Therefore, the Appointing authority shall examine if there is no conflict of interest undermining the EU official's independence either when recruiting them or when they come back after a break. Moreover, EU officials must not have any direct or indirect involvement in matters that may impair their independence (art. 11 a). Also, if they are engaging in an outside activity (paid or unpaid) or any assignment during their mandate, EU officials must seek the authorization of the Appointing authority. It shall be refused if it impairs with the EU officials’ duties or the institutions’ interests (art. 12b). Finally, EU official's duties to integrity and discretion continue to stand even after leaving service (art. 16). There is a cooling-off period of two years within which they must notify their intention to engage in a new activity to their institution, aiming at constraining the revolving door problem. Finally, EU officials shall refrain from any unauthorized disclosure of information received in the line of their duty (art. 17). Article 339 TFEU highlights the obligation of professional secrecy, during and after EU officials’ services.

European Commission 
The commissioners are chosen according to their general competence, European commitment and independence "beyond doubts". They are also subject to different duties such as independence, integrity and discretion regarding the acceptance of certain benefits and or appointments during and after their mandate (art. 17 §3 TEU + 245 TFEU). If those duties of integrity and discretion are breached, they may be subject to judicial proceedings leading to the suspension of their pension and/or other rights or to be compulsory retired (art. 245 + 247 TFEU).

The Commission has established its own Code of conduct in 1999. It was revised already in 2011 and then "reformed" after the Barroso Case in 2017 (cfr infra). This last version has been applied since the 1st February 2018. The key features concern the declaration of interest, transparency, the cooling off period and the "new" Independent Ethical Committee.

 First, each commissioner, before being appointed, has to fulfill a declaration of interests which is revised each year and made public. It aims at highlighting financial interests that may give rise to conflicts of interests, any function occupied during the past 10 years, and pointing to affiliation to organisms susceptible to influence the exercise of their public mandate. It may concern spouses and minor children, if needed (art. 3). Those are the main areas of inquiry during the European Parliament's hearings prior to the effective nomination of a commissioner. If such a conflict of interest emerges, there is a procedure that may end by a recusation (art. 4).
 Second, commissioners can only meet with people registered in the Transparency Register, when those meetings fall within the scope provided by the 2014 Interinstitutional Agreement between the European Parliament and the European Commission (art. 7): "activities concerning the provision of legal and other professional advice are not covered" (point 10). This register is not comprehensive since its material scope does not cover all activities influencing the decions-makingp process, the formulation and implementation of EU law. Therefore, the European Parliament, the Commission and the Council of the EU (for the first time) reached a compromise agreement on a mandatory Transparency Register since 15/12/2020 but still has to be formally adopted.
 Thirdly, there is a cooling off period of 2 years during which a two months’ notice is required before taking any job/benefits or appointments (art. 11, §2). If the activity is related to the commissioner's previous portfolio or seems to be contrary to art. 245 TFEU, the Independent Ethical Committee must be consulted. However, there is no authorization needed in some cases explicitly addressed in an exhaustive list (art. 11, §3). Moreover, ex-commissioners are barred from performing direct lobbying but only for 2 years (art. 11, §4). If the person concerned was the former president, the cooling-off period has been extended to 3 years (art. 11, §5). Still, there is no cooling period if it concerns public service meaning that the ex-commissioner can take a public service job without any cooling off period (art. 11, §6).
 Finally, the previous "Ad Hoc Ethical Committee" has been renamed "Independent Ethical Committee". Its members are appointed by the commission on the proposition of the President and their deliberations are confidential while their opinions/final decisions are made public (art. 12). If the commissioners or the president breached their duties and cooling-off  period but the material scope does not enter in the application of art. 245 or 247 TFEU, then, the concerned person may be reprimanded, even publicly, by the commission. In accordance with art. 16 of the Staff Regulation, an annual report has to be published, including the work of the committee (art. 13). Also, the president may ask the commissioner to resign (art. 17, §6 TUE).

European Parliament 
In its 2005 Statute for the Members of the European Parliament (MEPs), general principles and duties are laid down. Indeed, MEPs should remain free and independent (art. 2), they must not be pressured or exert any binding mandate (art. 3) and "safeguard their independence" (art. 9).

The European Parliament has also established its own Code of conduct which has applied since 1 January 2012. Here, the code provides an explicit definition of "conflict of interest" (art. 3). MEPs must also establish a declaration of financial interests (art. 4). Former MEPs’ activities may involve lobbying but must be notified to the European Parliament. Consequently, those MEPs involved in lobbying must not benefit from the facilities granted to others former MEPs (art. 6) such as entering the Parliament's building, using Parliament's restaurants and cafeteria, libraries, documentation centers or car parks. In the same vein of the commission, there is also an Advisory Committee that must, in accordance with article 16 of the Staff Regulation, publish an annual report (art. 7). If there is an alleged breach, the President of the European Parliament refers to the Advisory Committee, which may conduct an audition and then refer back to the President on what can be done. The Member under investigation may give a written opinion to the President and then the President issues a reasoned decision (art. 8). There is an exhaustive list concerning the  penalties listed in art. 166§3 to §5 of the Rules of Procedures. Since April 2013, the European Parliament adopted implementing measures of the "Code of Conduct on Gifts received in an official capacity, Invitations to events organised by third parties and Monitoring procedure".

Since 31/01/2019, the EP has also amended its Rules of Procedure saying that "rapporteurs, shadow rapporteurs or committee chairs shall, for each report, publish online all scheduled meetings with interest representatives falling under the scope of the Transparency Register

If the European Parliament's Code of Conduct seems permissive (e.g. there is any cooling-off period), the Parliament is concerned by the revolving door effect and has used its power over other institutions to prevent them. In some cases, the EP must give its  approval for the appointment of the leaders/officials of other European agencies for instance the European Supervisory Authorities. In January 2020 the Parliament stopped an entering revolving door: it has declined to approve the Irish central Banker Gerry Cross from becoming executive director of the European Banking Authority (EBA) because of his lobbying past within the financial lobby group Association for Financial Markets in Europe (AFME).

Critics and developments 
Former EU Commissioners passing through the revolving door attract much attention, but such situations occur in every EU institution, not only the commission. The European Union is said to have a permissive culture. It has often waved its own rules to allow revolvers to have a job in the institutions or to be employed in the private sector after their term in office. People going through the revolving door bring industry expertise and insight that can be valuable for regulators, it can sometimes be conceptualized as an educational process  by researchers working on the topic. The European Union combines very technical domains where such specific knowledge and competences could be valuable. There is a tension between the need for expertise and the resort to the revolving door to obtain this knowledge.

However, the EU has been pressured to address the issue more convincingly and to reform its rules sometimes qualified as weak. The code of Conduct of the Commission has been reformed after the Barosso Gate.This can be seen as a progress in regulating the issue but these efforts may be perceived as insufficient. Indeed, the cooling-off period after employment in the Union lasts for 18 months. In contrast, other countries have stricter rules. For instance, former Candadien officials are to wait 5 years after their term to engage in any lobbying activities. The European Parliament has also taken steps to close the entering side of the revolving door when it blocked the nomination of Gerry Cross as executive director of the European Banking Authority.

According to a report by Transparency International - EU Office, which analysed the career paths of 485 former Members of the European Parliament and 27 former European Commissioners, the revolving door phenomenon is present at the EU level as well. The report Access All Areas finds that 30% of the 161 MEPs who left politics for other employment were employed by organisations which were registered on the EU Transparency Register at the start of 2017. At the same time, the report found that 15 out of 27 Commissioners who finished their service in 2014 entered employment with organisations on the EU lobby register after the end of their 18-month cooling-off period. The report also notes that the regulatory framework surrounding the revolving door phenomenon in the European Union could be improved by a stronger ethics framework, notably an independent ethics body which would decide which professional activities are subject to a conflict of interest.

European cases

Goldman Sachs
Goldman Sachs the investment bank, is known to use the revolving doors in the USA as well as with former EU officials to gain expertise and/or inside information on EU regulatory matters. There are several examples of revolvers between the European Union and the bank.

Peter Sutherland was a Commissioner responsible for Competition Policy between 1985 and 1989. He left the commission to found the World Trade Organization and became its first president during his cool-off period from 1993 to 1995. In July 1995 he became Chairman of Goldman Sachs.

Mario Draghi is an Italian politician. He worked in the Italian Treasury but then left to become Vice Chairman and managing director of the Goldman Sachs international division. In this branch he dealt with European corporations and governments. He also led Goldman Sachs's European strategy. Mario Draghi left the bank when he was appointed president of the European Central Bank in 2011.

Mario Monti is an Italian economist and politician. He was appointed as commissioner for the Internal Market under the Santer Commission (1995-1999) and for Competition under Romano Prodi (1999-2004). He started serving on the board of international advisers of the bank in 2002 during his term. In November 2011, Mario Monti came back in the public sphere to lead the Italian government formed by technocrats in the sovereign debt crisis.

The revolving door that received the most media coverage in Europe is the one concerning José Manuel Barroso. He was president of the European Commission for 2 consecutive terms between 2004 and 2014. He led the commission during the 2008 subprime crisis and helped oversee the financial reforms that followed the economic collapse. In 2016, after his cool-off period former President Barroso announced his move towards the investment bank. He became the non-executive chairman. His hiring was so controversial that the Juncker Commission referred the case to the commission's Ad Hoc Ethic Committee.

Other controversies 

In July 1999, Martin Bangemann the Commissioner for Industrial Affairs was suspended from his duties after his decision to accept a position with Telefónica, Spain largest telephone company. While he was still Commissioner he announced that he wanted to join the Board of directors of Telefónica and that he would resign from the commission.The Commission judged  that he should have resigned before negotiating his new functions with his future employer.

In 2004, Neelie Kroes was made Commissioner for Competition, in spite of having displayed 25 corporate jobs on her resume. Later on it was found that she also served 7 years as a lobbyist for an arms manufacturer, which she had not disclosed. After her 2 terms as commissioner for Competition and later on for Digital Agenda and her cooling period she applied for a job in the industry she previously regulated.

Adam Farkas was executive director of the European Banking Authority. He left his occupation to become head of the Association for Financial Markets in Europe (AFME), a powerful financial lobby. The European Banking Authority disregarded conflict of interest and let him go without a cooling period. A complaint was lodged to the Ombudsman of the EU and it was concluded that the EBA should not have allowed that move.

France 
A law in the penal code of France governing public officials who move between the public and private sectors requires a three-year wait between working in the government and taking a job in the private sector.

Hong Kong 
In 2008, the appointment of Leung Chin-man as executive director of New World China Land led to much controversy. Leung was previously a senior civil servant and administrative officer in charge of lands. His appointment as an executive director of a subsidiary of a land developer led to allegations of collusion of interests and delayed interests. He resigned after two weeks, and the territory's Legislative Council had, for years, an inquiry into the matter.

Japan

 is the institutionalized practice where Japanese senior bureaucrats retire to high-profile positions in the private and public sectors. The practice was increasingly viewed as corrupt and a drag on unfastening the ties between private sector and state which prevent economic and political reforms.

In April 2007, a law to phase out amakudari prohibits ministries from attempting to place bureaucrats in industry with implementation in 2009. However, the law also removed a two-year ban that prevented retiring officials from taking jobs with companies with which they had official dealings during the five years before retirement.

Definition
The term's literal meaning, "descent from heaven," refers to Shinto myths of gods descending from heaven to earth; the modern usage employs it as a metaphor, where "heaven" refers to the upper echelons of the civil service, the civil servants are the deities, and the earth is the private-sector corporations. In amakudari, senior civil servants retire to join organizations linked with or under the jurisdiction of their ministries or agencies when they reach mandatory retirement age, usually between 50 and 60 in the public service. The former officials may collude with their former colleagues to help their new employers secure government contracts, avoid regulatory inspections and generally secure preferential treatment from the bureaucracy.

Amakudari may also be a reward for preferential treatment provided by officials to their new employers during their term in the civil service. Some government organisations are said to be expressly maintained for the purpose of hiring retiring bureaucrats and paying them high salaries at taxpayers' expense.

In the strictest meaning of amakudari, bureaucrats retire into private companies. In other forms bureaucrats move into government corporations (横滑り yokosuberi), are granted successive public and private sector appointments (渡り鳥 wataridori) or may become politicians, including becoming members of parliament (政界転身 seikai tenshin).

Political scientists have identified amakudari as a central feature of Japan's political and economic structure. The practice is thought to bind private and public sector in a tight embrace and prevent political and economic change.

History
Amakudari is widespread in many branches of the Japanese government but is subject to government efforts to regulate the practice. Pressure to reduce amakudari retirement to corporations may be leading to an increase in bureaucrats retiring to other public sector organisations instead.

Amakudari was a minor issue before World War II since government officials could be outplaced to a large number of industrial organization that were nationalized. However, reforms during the Occupation of Japan eliminated most of these nationalized organizations resulting in a need to outplace individuals to the private sector. Such outplacement is inevitable in a personnel system where traditional Confucian values prevent one who entered the organization at the same time as another to become his subordinate

A 1990 study suggested that amakudari retirements to large companies by bureaucrats from prominent ministries, such as the Ministry of Finance, had peaked in 1985 but that the practice was on the increase by bureaucrats from other types of government organisations such as the National Tax Agency. As a result, the percentage of former bureaucrats on the boards of private-sector listed companies had remained stable at 2%.

A series of scandals in the mid-1990s focused the media spotlight on amakudari. In the 1994 general contracting (zenekon) scandal, corruption was uncovered among bureaucrats associated with building contractors, leading to the jailing of high-ranking politician Shin Kanemaru for tax evasion. In the mortgage scandal of 1996, Japanese housing lenders went on a lending spree and racked up bad debts worth 6 trillion yen ($65.7 billion) sparking a financial crisis. The industry was supposed to be regulated by the Ministry of Finance, but the presence of its former officials in top jobs at the lenders is thought to have deflected oversight.

It wasn't until the next decade that Japanese prime ministers responded with policies to limit amakudari, although it is unclear whether these policies are having any effect. In July 2002, Prime Minister Junichiro Koizumi ordered that strict amakudari be ended, because of its association with corruption between business and politics. Koizumi's successor, Prime Minister Shinzo Abe enacted new rules as part of a policy pledge to completely eradicate amakudari in 2007, but his reforms were criticised as toothless (see below) and a campaign ploy for Upper House elections in July 2007.

While policy has focused on limiting amakudari to private companies, the number of bureaucrats retiring to jobs at other government organisations (yokosuberi or "sideslip") has surged reaching 27,882 appointments in 2006 up 5,789 on the previous year. These organisations, numbering 4,576, received 98 percent of the expenses for state projects without being subject to the bidding processes faced by private companies.

Over 50 years ending in 2010, 68 high-level government bureaucrats have taken jobs with electricity suppliers after retirement from their government positions. In 2011, 13 retired government bureaucrats were employed in senior positions in Japanese electric utilities.

Legal status
Amakudari is subject to rules which were revised in April 2007 in response to corruption scandals. Under the new rules, ministries are instructed to slowly stop helping bureaucrats land new jobs over three years starting in 2009. Instead, a job center to be set up by the end of 2008 would take on the role, and government agencies and ministries will be prohibited from brokering new jobs for retirees.

However, the law removed a two-year ban that prevented retiring officials from taking jobs with companies with which they had official dealings during the five years before retirement, which may increase amakudari. It also left considerable loopholes, including not placing restrictions on watari in which retired bureaucrats move from one organization to another. Bureaucrats could retire to a job at another government agency, and then switch jobs to a private company later. Critics say that the government could better prevent Amakudari by raising the retirement age for bureaucrats above 50.

In October 2006, 339 public entities were violating the guidelines concerning amakudari, a figure 38 times higher than the number for the previous year. This declined to 166 by July 2007.

Impact
As well as scandals, the effects of amakudari have been documented by a sizable body of research.

Some studies find that amakudari promotes more risky business activities. A 2001 study found that banks with amakudari employees were found to behave less prudently the more retired civil servants they employed (measured by the capital-asset ratio, an indicator of the prudential behaviour of banks).

Many studies find that companies with amakudari employees are subjected to less oversight by public agencies. Around 70 percent of public contracts awarded to organisations that employed hired retired bureaucrats through amakudari were given without a bidding process in 2005. The contracts were worth a total 233 billion yen. By contrast 18 percent of private companies that didn't have ex-bureaucrats on the payroll got contracts without bidding.

New Zealand
There is no major legislation against revolving door practices in New Zealand, but some ad hoc provisions exist in relation to certain industries. For example, a scandal in which MP Taito Phillip Field was jailed for corruption in relation to improper use of his government position to benefit from helping people with immigration applications was influential in the creation of a restraint of trade clause in the Immigration Advisers Licensing Act 2007. The Act prohibits Ministers of Immigration, Associate Ministers of Immigration and immigration officials from becoming a licensed immigration adviser for one year after leaving government employment.

United Kingdom

The movement of senior civil servants and government ministers into business roles is overseen by the Advisory Committee on Business Appointments (ACOBA), but it is not a statutory body and has only advisory powers. The Channel Four Dispatches programme 'Cabs for Hire', broadcast in early 2010, which showed several sitting members of Parliament and former ministers offering their influence and contacts in an effort to get lobbying jobs, has generated renewed concern about this issue. A Transparency International UK report on the subject, published in May 2011, called for ACOBA to be replaced by a statutory body with greater powers to regulate the post-public employment of former ministers and crown servants. It also argued that the committee should be more representative of society.

United States

"Under current law, government officials who make contracting decisions must either wait a year before joining a military contractor or, if they want to switch immediately, must start in an affiliate or division unrelated to their government work. One big loophole is that these restrictions do not apply to many high-level policy makers..., who can join corporations or their boards without waiting."

Examples of individuals who have moved between roles in this way in sensitive areas include Dick Cheney (military contracting), Linda Fisher (pesticide and biotech), Philip Perry (homeland security), Pat Toomey, Dan Coats, John C. Dugan, a Department of the Treasury official in the administration of President George H. W. Bush who pressed for banking deregulation and repeal of Glass-Steagall Act, then as counsel to the American Bankers Association lobbied for the Gramm-Leach-Bliley Act of 1999 repealing key provisions of the Glass-Steagall Act, and then starting in 2005 returned in a senior government role as Comptroller of the Currency,  and former FCC commissioner Meredith Attwell Baker (media lobbying). High-profile Democratic Representative Dick Gephardt left office to become a lobbyist and his lobbying agency, Gephardt Government Affairs Group, earned close to $7 million in revenues in 2010 from clients including Goldman Sachs, Boeing, Visa Inc., Ameren Corporation, and Waste Management Inc.

Securities and Exchange Commission 
Many former commissioners of the Securities and Exchange Commission and SEC employees have also been employed by private firms in the industry they once regulated. Former chairman Jay Clayton currently serves on the board of Apollo Global Management as the lead independent director. Citadel Securities has employed numerous former SEC employees, including Stephen Luparello as its general counsel and adviser, Ryan VanGrack as its deputy chief legal officer, David Glocker as its Chief Compliance Officer, and Gregg Berman as Director of Research. As of 2021, Robinhood Markets employed former Commissioner Daniel M. Gallagher as Chief Legal Officer, former chief of staff to the chairman Lucas Moskowitz as deputy general counsel, and staff attorneys Justin Daly and Benjamin Brown as lobbyists. 

Major financial institutions also hire former SEC attorneys as lead counsel, including Stephen M. Cutler at JPMorgan Chase, Gary Lynch at Bank of America, and Richard Walker at Deutsche Bank.

The subprime crisis

Overview 
The subprime crisis erupted in 2007 after several years of unsafe lending and speculation by US banks.

In order to revive their economy and real estate loans banks began to grant loans to households that did not meet credit score criteria. Subprime loans are a type of mortgage offered to individuals who do not qualify for traditional loans due to poor credit ratings and therefore pay larger interests rates in order to compensate for the extra risk taken by the lender. The crisis occurred in 2008, property prices eventually collapsed whilst the aforementioned interest rates rose. Households had reached their maximum debt capacity, thus defaulting on their loans and further increasing their debts. As a result, real estate assets were seized, which exacerbated the fall in the housing market.

This, in turn, led to a fall in investor and institutional confidence and a collapse of the stock market, ultimately developing into a global economic crisis.

Link to subprime crisis 
The revolving doors were significantly prevalent in the financial sector and were cited by the OECD and some non-governmental organisations as one of the main causes of the 2008 financial crisis. This crisis was preceded by the US financial sector entering more and more into cooperation with federal regulators agencies.  Through the process of the revolving doors not only Wall Street veterans occupied key positions in Washington, but it also fostered the development of strong personal connections between senior bankers and high government officials, which gave the so-called "too-big-to-fail" banks, privileged access to decisions-makers and contributed to promoting the Wall Street worldview in the political world. They were finally able to persuade the policymakers that the deregulation of the financial sector was in the public interest and did not only serve their self-interest.

It is striking that a particularly large number of revolving door movements took place in 2007 and 2008.  Figures show that mainly public-to-private movements, that is to say, the transition from politics to the private sector, were completed.

See also
 E-governance
 Interlocking directorate
 Militaryindustrial complex
 Goldman Sachs' revolving door
 Pantouflage
 Jeon-gwan ye-u
 Government-business relations in Japan
 Regulatory capture

Explanatory notes

References

External links

  Revolving Door database at Opensecrets.org – searchable database
 Revolving Doors in the UK Defence Industry UNICORN article - www.againstcorruption.org/
 Revolving door between the US Government and Industry Government officials who now work at IFPMA, PhRMA, or law firms and lobbying firms that represent the pharmaceutical industry
 Revolving Door at Project on Government Oversight
Revolving Door Congress Members data from First Street
 
Video
Dispatches - Politicians for Hire - Channel 4 - Dispatches documentary on lobbying in the UK

Political science terminology
Political science theories
Lobbying
Public choice theory
Political corruption
Ethically disputed political practices
Conflict of interest
Metaphors referring to objects

Economy of Japan
Government of Japan
Political scandals in Japan
Politics of Japan